Mary Louise Roberts  (17 February 1886 – 27 May 1968) was a New Zealand masseuse, physiotherapist and mountaineer. She was born in Dunedin, New Zealand, in 1886. She was New Zealand's most celebrated physiotherapist (before the coining of that name) and was for more the twenty years the principal of Dunedin Hospital school of massage, the only such training facility in New Zealand. In the 1946 King's Birthday Honours, Roberts was appointed an Officer of the Order of the British Empire.

References

1886 births
1968 deaths
New Zealand mountain climbers
New Zealand physiotherapists
Masseurs
Female climbers
People from Dunedin in health professions
People educated at St Hilda's Collegiate School
New Zealand Officers of the Order of the British Empire 
20th-century New Zealand educators